The Moyne River, a perennial river of the Glenelg Hopkins catchment, is located in the Western District of Victoria, Australia.

Course and features
The Moyne River rises near , from the edge of the lava flows west-southwest of Penshurst. The river flows generally south, joined by two minor tributaries, spills into the Belfast Lough and then reaches its mouth to empty into Port Fairy Bay in the Bass Strait near . The river descends  over its  course.

The mouth of the river has been significantly altered. The river originally spilled into the Bass Strait, south of the town of Port Fairy, through a series of narrow channels that led westward from the site of the present-day mouth. At that stage, the southern outlet of the Moyne, the Back Passage, was narrow and the opening to the sea was often too rough for boats to leave or enter the port; the main eastern outlet was blocked by a shallow sand bar. These navigational impediments led to the construction of a jetty from Flagstaff Hill and a boulder wall breakwater between Griffiths Island and Rabbit Island. Training walls constructed in the 1870s curve from the northern part of Griffiths Island through the sand bar. These structures rapidly led to the accumulation of large amounts of sand on the north coast of Griffiths Island and back shore erosion north of the breakwaters. A protective stone wall was added in 1911.

See also

 List of rivers in Victoria
 Griffiths Island

References

External links

 
 

Glenelg Hopkins catchment
Rivers of Barwon South West (region)
Coastline of Victoria (Australia)
Western District (Victoria)